Martin Patrick Durkin (March 18, 1894 – November 13, 1955) was a U.S. administrator. He served as Secretary of Labor from January 21, 1953, to September 10, 1953, where he was the "plumber" of President Dwight Eisenhower's "Nine Millionaires and a Plumber" cabinet.

Biography
Durkin was born in Chicago, Illinois, on March 18, 1894, the son of James J. Durkin and Mary Catherine (née Higgins).  At the age of 17, Durkin became involved in the plumber's and pipe fitter's union. On August 29, 1921, Durkin married the former Anna H. McNicholas. They had three sons: Martin Bernard,  William Joseph and John Francis Durkin. He eventually became president of that union, and then served as Director of Labor for the State of Illinois from 1933 to 1941. He worked closely with the President Franklin D. Roosevelt's Secretary of Labor, Frances Perkins.

Durkin served as the Secretary of Labor during the Eisenhower administration.  A Democrat among Republicans, he unsuccessfully pushed for his revisions in the Taft-Hartley Act.  This led to his resignation after less than eight months in office, the shortest tenure of any Secretary of Labor.

He died in Washington D.C., from complications of cancer surgery. He was interred in St. Mary Catholic Cemetery in Evergreen Park, Illinois.

See also
 List of U.S. political appointments that crossed party lines

References

External links
 Department of Labor biography
 Department of Labor history of Eisenhower years

1894 births
1955 deaths
American plumbers
Eisenhower administration cabinet members
20th-century American politicians
Politicians from Chicago
United States Secretaries of Labor
Catholics from Illinois